William King House, also known as Royal Oak Farm, in Franklin, Tennessee, United States, was listed on the National Register of Historic Places, but was removed from the National Register in 1996.

The two-story wood-frame I house was built circa 1854 and included Central passage plan architecture. A 1988 study of Williamson County historical resources assessed that this house was one of the "best two-story vernacular I-House examples" in the county;  the others highly rated were the Beverly Toon House, the Alpheus Truett House, the Thomas Brown House, the Claiborne Kinnard House, and the Stokely Davis House.

References

Central-passage houses in Tennessee
Former National Register of Historic Places in Tennessee
Greek Revival houses in Tennessee
Houses completed in 1854
Houses in Franklin, Tennessee
Houses on the National Register of Historic Places in Tennessee
National Register of Historic Places in Williamson County, Tennessee